Marandiz may refer to:
 Marandiz, Bajestan
 Marandiz, Bardaskan